"I Write Sins Not Tragedies" is a song by American rock band Panic! at the Disco, is the second single from their debut studio album, A Fever You Can't Sweat Out (2005), and was released in the United States as a digital download on January 16, 2006. The pizzicato cello motif that the song is built upon was played by session musician Heather Stebbins. The song reached  7 on the US Billboard Hot 100, the band's only top-40 hit until the release of "Hallelujah" in 2015, and only top-ten hit until "High Hopes" in 2018. While the song failed to hit the top 10 on the Alternative Songs chart—peaking at No. 12, which was lower than their prior single, "The Only Difference Between Martyrdom and Suicide Is Press Coverage", which peaked at No. 5—the song's success on the Hot 100 and Mainstream Top 40 (at No. 2) charts was what made the song one of the biggest modern rock hits of 2006, and it is still one of the band's most-played songs on alternative radio stations to this day.

In the United Kingdom, the song was released on February 27, 2006, as a limited-edition single with a free sticker. Because the sticker was included with the CD single, the song was not eligible for the UK Singles Chart. Official Charts Company rules state that stickers are not allowed in single releases. Later, due to the popularity of the track and following further single releases of "Lying Is the Most Fun a Girl Can Have Without Taking Her Clothes Off" and "But It's Better If You Do" reaching the top 40, the single was re-released on October 30, 2006. Despite receiving significant radio airplay upon its re-release, the single reached only No. 25 on the UK Singles Chart.

Many U.S. radio stations, in response to the language found in the song, wanted an edited version. The lyrics "The poor groom's bride is a whore" and "Haven't you people ever heard of closing a goddamn door?" were changed by replacing "whore" with a "shhh" sound and removing "god" in "goddamn". Some stations – generally modern rock stations – still play the original version.

The song was covered by Fall Out Boy, fellow Decaydance band, for their live album, Live in Phoenix. Fall Out Boy commonly uses the song's chorus as a lead-in to "This Ain't a Scene, It's an Arms Race" in concert.

"I Write Sins Not Tragedies" was ranked No. 3 in Billboards Best 2000s Video poll, and Variety ranked it as one of the best emo songs of all time in 2022.

Title
The title of the song, while not mentioned in the lyrics, refers to Douglas Coupland's novel Shampoo Planet, wherein the main character, Tyler Johnson, says: "I am writing a list of tragic character flaws on my dollar bills with a felt pen. I am thinking of the people in my universe and distilling for each of these people the one flaw in their character that will be their downfall – the flaw that will be their undoing. What I write are not sins; I write tragedies."

Music video

"I Write Sins Not Tragedies" is Panic! at the Disco's first single to have a music video, and the video was published on July 18, 2006. ("The Only Difference Between Martyrdom and Suicide Is Press Coverage" was the first single, but no video was filmed.) The video for the song takes place at a strange, circus-themed wedding played by the Lucent Dossier Vaudeville Cirque.

The video starts as the bride, played by Jessica Preston Gatena, and groom, Daniel Isaac McGuffey, are about to be married. Her family dress and behave formally, but they are revealed later to have fallen asleep and have eyes painted on their eyelids. The groom's family are lower-class entertainers and carnival folk, who interrupt the wedding. The ringmaster, played by vocalist Brendon Urie, acts as narrator and disrupts the events. After an argument between the two families, the bride runs out and is followed by one of her guests. The ringmaster drags the groom outside by his tie, where his fiancée is kissing the guest who followed her out of the church. The groom straightens up, looking shocked, and Urie and the groom bow to the camera. The ringmaster is revealed to be the groom's alter ego.

The music video, filmed by director Shane Drake, won the award for Video of the Year during the 2006 MTV Video Music Awards. This marked the first occasion since the 1989 VMAs that the winner of Video of the Year did not win in any other categories. The video was also ranked No. 7 on VH1's list of the Top 100 Videos of 2006.

The video was shot in December 2005. According to vocalist Brendon Urie, he and guitarist Ryan Ross suffered from the flu while filming the video clip. In August 2011, the video won Best VMA-Winning Video of All Time, in a worldwide poll on MTV's website.

Track listing
UK 7-inch poster bag 
 A. "I Write Sins Not Tragedies"

UK CD single 
 "I Write Sins Not Tragedies"
 "Nails for Breakfast, Tacks for Snacks" 

WMI CD single 
 "I Write Sins Not Tragedies" – 3:10
 "Nails for Breakfast, Tacks for Snacks"  – 3:57
 "The Only Difference Between Martyrdom and Suicide Is Press Coverage"  – 5:04

UK CD single 
 "I Write Sins Not Tragedies"
 "Karma Police" 

UK 7-inch gatefold sleeve 
 A. "I Write Sins Not Tragedies"
 B. "But It's Better If You Do" 

UK 7-inch picture disc 
 A. "I Write Sins Not Tragedies"
 B. "I Write Sins Not Tragedies" 

Enhanced CD single 
 "I Write Sins Not Tragedies"
 "Nails for Breakfast, Tacks for Snacks" 
 "The Only Difference Between Martyrdom and Suicide Is Press Coverage" 
 "I Write Sins Not Tragedies"

Charts

Weekly charts

Year-end charts

Certifications

!scope="col" colspan="3"| Ringtone
|-

Release history

References

External links
 

2006 singles
Panic! at the Disco songs
MTV Video of the Year Award
2005 songs
Songs written by Ryan Ross
Music videos directed by Shane Drake
Songs about marriage
Songs written by Spencer Smith (musician)
Songs written by Brendon Urie
Songs about infidelity
Fueled by Ramen singles